Cariphalte is a brand of hot-pour rubberised bitumen sealant (bitumen technology) manufactured by Shell Bitumen, used for race track and expansion joints. It was released for commercial use in 1986 and has been used on Cleveland and Kent concrete roadways including Dartford Crossing, the A4, the A10, the M2, and the M20.

There are two brands of Cariphalte. Cariphalte DM, the first brand, is a "styrene block co-polymer, styrene-butadiene-styrene (SBS)". Cariphalte DA, the second brand, is "used for friction course mixtures".

References

Further reading 
Read, John; David Whiteoak, Shell Bitumen (2003). The Shell Bitumen Handbook, Thomas Telford. pp. 70–72. .

Pavements
Shell plc